Harrison Scott (born 5 March 1996) is a British racing driver.

Career

Karting
Born in Althorne, Scott began karting in 2005 at the age of nine. Throughout his seven-year career, he took the British Karting title and two third places in the World and European Cups.

Formula 4
In 2013, Scott graduated to single-seaters, partaking in British Formula Ford with Falcon Motorsport in the Scholarship class. He took six wins, across two seasons, and finished vice-champion in the standings on both occasions.

Eurocup Formula Renault 2.0
In 2015, Scott moved up to Eurocup Formula Renault 2.0 with AVF and finished twelfth in his first season. He remained with the team for the following season and took two poles and three victories to finish fourth in the standings.

Euroformula Open
In 2017 Scott joined RP Motorsport in Euroformula Open Championship. He dominated the season winning 12 from 14 races that he had contested.

Pro Mazda
Scott will continue his career in North America, where he will enter the 2018 Pro Mazda Championship with RP Motorsport.

Formula 1
As of 2022, Scott is employed by Williams F1 as a simulator driver.

Racing record

Career summary

† As Scott was a guest driver, he was ineligible for championship points.

Complete Pro Mazda Championship results

References

External links
 
 

1996 births
Living people
English racing drivers
Formula Renault Eurocup drivers
BRDC British Formula 3 Championship drivers
Euroformula Open Championship drivers
Indy Pro 2000 Championship drivers
F3 Asian Championship drivers
Karting World Championship drivers
Formula Renault 2.0 NEC drivers
AV Formula drivers
Teo Martín Motorsport drivers
RP Motorsport drivers
Hitech Grand Prix drivers